

Events

Pre-1600
 475 – The Roman general Orestes forces western Roman Emperor Julius Nepos to flee his capital city, Ravenna.
 489 – Theodoric, king of the Ostrogoths, defeats Odoacer at the Battle of Isonzo, forcing his way into Italy.
 632 – Fatimah, daughter of the Islamic prophet Muhammad, dies, with her cause of death being a controversial topic among the Sunni Muslims and Shia Muslims.
 663 – Silla–Tang armies crush the Baekje restoration attempt and force Yamato Japan to withdraw from Korea in the Battle of Baekgang.
1189 – Third Crusade: The Crusaders begin the Siege of Acre under Guy of Lusignan.
1521 – Ottoman wars in Europe: The Ottoman Turks occupy Belgrade.
1524 – The Kaqchikel Maya rebel against their former Spanish allies during the Spanish conquest of Guatemala.
1542 – Turkish–Portuguese War: Battle of Wofla: The Portuguese are scattered, their leader Christovão da Gama is captured and later executed.
1565 – Pedro Menéndez de Avilés sights land near St. Augustine, Florida and founds the oldest continuously occupied European-established city in the continental United States.

1601–1900
1609 – Henry Hudson discovers Delaware Bay.
1619 – Election of Ferdinand II, Holy Roman Emperor.
1640 – Second Bishop's War: King Charles I's English army loses to a Scottish Covenanter force at the Battle of Newburn.
1648 – Second English Civil War: The Siege of Colchester ends when Royalists Forces surrender to the Parliamentary Forces after eleven weeks, during the Second English Civil War.
1709 – Meidingnu Pamheiba is crowned King of Manipur.
1789 – William Herschel discovers a new moon of Saturn: Enceladus.
1810 – Napoleonic Wars: The French Navy accepts the surrender of a British Royal Navy fleet at the Battle of Grand Port. 
1830 – The Baltimore and Ohio Railroad's new Tom Thumb steam locomotive races a horse-drawn car, presaging steam's role in U.S. railroads.
1833 – The Slavery Abolition Act 1833 receives royal assent, making the purchase or ownership of slaves illegal in the British Empire with exceptions.
1845 – The first issue of Scientific American magazine is published.
1849 – Revolutions of 1848 in the Austrian Empire: After a month-long siege, Venice, which had declared itself independent as the Republic of San Marco, surrenders to Austria.
1850 – Richard Wagner’s Lohengrin premieres at the Staatskapelle Weimar.
1859 – The Carrington event is the strongest geomagnetic storm on record to strike the Earth. Electrical telegraph service is widely disrupted.
1861 – American Civil War: Union forces attack Cape Hatteras, North Carolina in the Battle of Hatteras Inlet Batteries which lasts for two days.
1862 – American Civil War: Second Battle of Bull Run, also known as the Battle of Second Manassas.  The battle ends on August 30.  
1867 – The United States takes possession of the (at this point unoccupied) Midway Atoll.
1879 – Anglo-Zulu War: Cetshwayo, last king of the Zulus, is captured by the British.
1898 – Caleb Bradham's beverage "Brad's Drink" is renamed "Pepsi-Cola".

1901–present
1901 – Silliman University is founded in the Philippines. It is the first American private school in the country.
1909 – A group of mid-level Greek Army officers launches the Goudi coup, seeking wide-ranging reforms.
1913 – Queen Wilhelmina opens the Peace Palace in The Hague.
1914 – World War I: The Royal Navy defeats the German fleet in the Battle of Heligoland Bight.
1916 – World War I: Germany declares war on Romania.
  1916   – World War I: Italy declares war on Germany.
1917 – Ten suffragists, members of the Silent Sentinels, are arrested while picketing the White House in favor of women's suffrage in the United States.
1921 – Russian Civil War: The Red Army dissolved the Makhnovshchina, after driving the Revolutionary Insurgent Army out of Ukraine.
1924 – The Georgian opposition stages the August Uprising against the Soviet Union.
1936 – Nazi Germany begins its mass arrests of Jehovah's Witnesses, who are interned in concentration camps. 
1937 – Toyota Motors becomes an independent company.
1943 – Denmark in World War II: German authorities demand that Danish authorities crack down on acts of resistance. The next day, martial law is imposed on Denmark.
1944 – World War II: Marseille and Toulon are liberated.
1946 – The Workers’ Party of North Korea, predecessor of the ruling Workers’ Party of Korea, is founded at a congress held in Pyongyang, North Korea.
1955 – Black teenager Emmett Till is lynched in Mississippi for whistling at a white woman, galvanizing the nascent civil rights movement.
1957 – U.S. Senator Strom Thurmond begins a filibuster to prevent the United States Senate from voting on the Civil Rights Act of 1957; he stopped speaking 24 hours and 18 minutes later, the longest filibuster ever conducted by a single Senator.
1963 – March on Washington for Jobs and Freedom: Rev. Dr. Martin Luther King Jr. gives his I Have a Dream speech.
1964 – The Philadelphia race riot begins.
1968 – Police and protesters clash during 1968 Democratic National Convention protests as protesters chant "The whole world is watching".
1973 – Norrmalmstorg robbery: Stockholm police secure the surrenders of hostage-takers Jan-Erik Olsson and Clark Olofsson, defusing the Norrmalmstorg hostage crisis. The behaviours of the hostages later give rise to the term Stockholm syndrome.
1988 – Ramstein air show disaster: Three aircraft of the Frecce Tricolori demonstration team collide and the wreckage falls into the crowd. Seventy-five are killed and 346 seriously injured.
1990 – Gulf War: Iraq declares Kuwait to be its newest province.
  1990   – An F5 tornado strikes the Illinois cities of Plainfield and Joliet, killing 29 people.
1993 – NASA's Galileo probe performs a flyby of the asteroid 243 Ida. Astronomers later discover a moon, the first known asteroid moon, in pictures from the flyby and name it Dactyl.
  1993   – Singaporean presidential election: Former Deputy Prime Minister Ong Teng Cheong is elected President of Singapore. Although it is the first presidential election to be determined by popular vote, the allowed candidates consist only of Ong and a reluctant whom the government had asked to run to confer upon the election the semblance of an opposition.
 1993 – The autonomous Croatian Community of Herzeg-Bosnia in Bosnia and Herzegovina was transformed into the Croatian Republic of Herzeg-Bosnia.
1996 – Chicago Seven defendant David Dellinger, antiwar activist Bradford Lyttle, Civil Rights Movement historian Randy Kryn, and eight others are arrested by the Federal Protective Service while protesting in a demonstration at the Kluczynski Federal Building in downtown Chicago during that year's Democratic National Convention.
1998 – Pakistan's National Assembly passes a constitutional amendment to make the "Qur'an and Sunnah" the "supreme law" but the bill is defeated in the Senate.
  1998   – Second Congo War: Loyalist troops backed by Angolan and Zimbabwean forces repulse the RCD and Rwandan offensive on Kinshasa.
1999 – The Russian space mission Soyuz TM-29 reaches completion, ending nearly 10 years of continuous occupation on the space station Mir as it approaches the end of its life.
2003 – In "one of the most complicated and bizarre crimes in the annals of the FBI", Brian Wells dies after becoming involved in a complex plot involving a bank robbery, a scavenger hunt, and a homemade explosive device.
2016 – The first experimental mission of ISRO's Scramjet Engine towards the realisation of an Air Breathing Propulsion System was successfully conducted from Satish Dhawan Space Centre SHAR, Sriharikota.
2017 – China–India border standoff: China and India both pull their troops out of Doklam, putting an end to a two month-long stalemate over China’s construction of a road in disputed territory.

Births

Pre-1600
1023 – Go-Reizei, emperor of Japan (d. 1068)
1366 – Jean Le Maingre, marshal of France (d. 1421)
1476 – Kanō Motonobu, Japanese painter (d. 1559)
1481 – Francisco de Sá de Miranda, Portuguese poet (d. 1558)
1582 – Taichang, emperor of China (d. 1620)
1591 – John Christian of Brieg, duke of Brzeg (d. 1639)
1592 – George Villiers, 1st Duke of Buckingham, English courtier and politician (d. 1628)

1601–1900
1612 – Marcus Zuerius van Boxhorn, Dutch linguist and scholar (d. 1653)
1667 – Louise of Mecklenburg-Güstrow, queen of Denmark and Norway (d. 1721)
1691 – Elisabeth Christine of Brunswick-Wolfenbüttel, Holy Roman Empress (d. 1750)
1714 – Anthony Ulrich, duke of Brunswick-Lüneburg (d. 1774)
1728 – John Stark, American general (d. 1822)
1739 – Agostino Accorimboni, Italian composer (d. 1818)
1749 – Johann Wolfgang von Goethe, German novelist, poet, playwright, and diplomat (d. 1832)
1774 – Elizabeth Ann Seton, American nun and saint, co-founded the Sisters of Charity Federation in the Vincentian-Setonian Tradition (d. 1821)
1801 – Antoine Augustin Cournot, French mathematician and philosopher (d. 1877)
1814 – Sheridan Le Fanu, Irish author (d. 1873)
1816 – Charles Sladen, English-Australian politician, 6th Premier of Victoria (d. 1884)
1822 – Graham Berry, English-Australian politician, 11th Premier of Victoria (d. 1904)
1827 – Catherine Mikhailovna, Russian grand duchess (d. 1894)
1833 – Edward Burne-Jones, English artist of the Pre-Raphaelite movement (d. 1898)
1837 – Francis von Hohenstein, duke of Teck (d. 1900)
1840 – Alexander Cameron Sim, Scottish-Japanese pharmacist and businessman, founded Kobe Regatta & Athletic Club (d. 1900)
1853 – Vladimir Shukhov, Russian architect and engineer, designed the Adziogol Lighthouse (d. 1939)
1859 – Matilda Howell, American archer (d. 1938)
  1859   – Vittorio Sella, Italian mountaineer and photographer (d. 1943)
1867 – Umberto Giordano, Italian composer and academic (d. 1948)
1878 – George Whipple, American physician and pathologist, Nobel Prize laureate (d. 1976)
1884 – Peter Fraser, Scottish-New Zealand journalist and politician, 24th Prime Minister of New Zealand (d. 1950)
1885 – Vance Palmer, Australian author, playwright, and critic (d. 1959)
1887 – August Kippasto, Estonian-Australian wrestler and poet (d. 1973)
  1887   – István Kühár, Slovenian priest and politician (d. 1922)
1888 – Evadne Price, Australian actress, astrologer, and author (d. 1985)
1891 – Benno Schotz, Estonian-Scottish sculptor and engineer (d. 1984)
1894 – Karl Böhm, Austrian conductor and director (d. 1981)
1896 – Firaq Gorakhpuri, Indian author, poet, and critic (d. 1982)
1898 – Charlie Grimm, American baseball player, manager, and sportscaster (d. 1983)
1899 – Charles Boyer, French-American actor, singer, and producer (d. 1978)
  1899   – Béla Guttmann, Hungarian footballer and coach (d. 1981)
  1899   – Andrei Platonov, Russian author and poet (d. 1951)
  1899   – James Wong Howe, Chinese American cinematographer (d. 1976)

1901–present
1903 – Bruno Bettelheim, Austrian-American psychologist and author (d. 1990)
1904 – Secondo Campini, Italian-American engineer (d. 1980)
  1904   – Leho Laurine, Estonian chess player (d. 1998)
1905 – Cyril Walters, Welsh-English cricketer (d. 1992)
1906 – John Betjeman, English poet and academic (d. 1984)
1908 – Roger Tory Peterson, American ornithologist and author (d. 1996)
1910 – Morris Graves, American painter and academic (d. 2001)
  1910   – Tjalling Koopmans, Dutch-American mathematician and economist Nobel Prize laureate (d. 1985)
1911 – Joseph Luns, Dutch politician and diplomat, 5th Secretary General of NATO (d. 2002)
1913 – Robertson Davies, Canadian journalist, author, and playwright (d. 1995)
  1913   – Jack Dreyfus, American businessman, founded the Dreyfus Corporation (d. 2009)
  1913   – Lindsay Hassett, Australian cricketer and sportscaster (d. 1993)
  1913   – Robert Irving, English conductor and director (d. 1991)
  1913   – Terence Reese, English bridge player and author (d. 1996)
  1913   – Richard Tucker, American tenor and actor (d. 1975)
1915 – Max Robertson, Bengal-born English sportscaster and author (d. 2009)
  1915   – Tasha Tudor, American author and illustrator (d. 2008)
1916 – Hélène Baillargeon, Canadian singer and actress (d. 1997)
  1916   – C. Wright Mills American sociologist and author (d. 1962)
  1916   – Jack Vance, American author (d. 2013)
1917 – Jack Kirby, American author and illustrator (d. 1994)
1918 – L. B. Cole, American illustrator and publisher (d. 1995)
1919 – Godfrey Hounsfield, English biophysicist and engineer Nobel Prize laureate (d. 2004)
1921 – John Herbert Chapman, Canadian physicist and engineer (d. 1979)
  1921   – Fernando Fernán Gómez, Spanish actor, director, and playwright (d. 2007)
  1921   – Nancy Kulp, American actress and soldier (d. 1991)
  1921   – Lidia Gueiler Tejada, the first female President of Bolivia (d. 2011)
1924 – Janet Frame, New Zealand author and poet (d. 2004)
  1924   – Tony MacGibbon, New Zealand cricketer and engineer (d. 2010)
  1924   – Peggy Ryan, American actress and dancer (d. 2004)
  1924   – Zalman Schachter-Shalomi, Ukrainian-American rabbi and author (d. 2014)
1925 – Billy Grammer, American singer-songwriter and guitarist (d. 2011)
  1925   – Donald O'Connor, American actor, singer, and dancer (d. 2003)
  1925   – Philip Purser, English author and critic (d. 2022)
1928 – F. William Free, American businessman (d. 2003)
  1928   – Vilayat Khan, Indian sitar player and composer (d. 2004)
1929 – István Kertész, Hungarian conductor (d. 1973)
  1929   – Roxie Roker, American actress (d. 1995)
1930 – Ben Gazzara, American actor (d. 2012)
  1930   – Windsor Davies, British actor (d. 2019)
1931 – Tito Capobianco, Argentinian director and producer (d. 2018)
  1931   – Cristina Deutekom, Dutch soprano and actress (d. 2014)
  1931   – Ola L. Mize, American colonel, Medal of Honor recipient (d. 2014)
  1931   – John Shirley-Quirk, English actor, singer, and educator (d. 2014)
  1931   – Roger Williams, English hepatologist and academic (d. 2020)
1932 – Andy Bathgate, Canadian ice hockey player, coach, and manager (d. 2016)
  1932   – Yakir Aharonov, Israeli academic and educator
1933 – Philip French, English journalist, critic, and producer (d. 2015)
  1933   – Patrick Kalilombe, Malawian bishop and theologian (d. 2012) 
1935 – Melvin Charney, Canadian sculptor and architect (d. 2012)
  1935   – Gilles Rocheleau, Canadian businessman and politician (d. 1998)
1936 – Don Denkinger, American baseball player and umpire
  1936   – Warren M. Washington, American atmospheric scientist 
1938 – Maurizio Costanzo, Italian journalist and academic
  1938   – Paul Martin, Canadian lawyer and politician, 21st Prime Minister of Canada
  1938   – Bengt Fahlström, Swedish journalist (d. 2017)
1939 – John Kingman, English mathematician and academic
1940 – William Cohen, American lawyer and politician, 20th United States Secretary of Defense
  1940   – Roger Pingeon, French cyclist (d. 2017)
1941 – Michael Craig-Martin, Irish painter and illustrator
  1941   – Toomas Leius, Estonian tennis player and coach
  1941   – John Stanley Marshall, English drummer 
  1941   – Paul Plishka, American opera singer
1942 – Wendy Davies, Welsh historian and academic
  1942   – Jorge Urosa, Venezuelan cardinal  
1943 – Surayud Chulanont, Thai general and politician, 24th Prime Minister of Thailand
  1943   – Robert Greenwald, American director and producer 
  1943   – Shuja Khanzada, Pakistani colonel and politician (d. 2015)
  1943   – Lou Piniella, American baseball player and manager
  1943   – David Soul, American actor and singer
  1943   – Jihad Al-Atrash, Lebanese actor and voice actor
1944 – Marianne Heemskerk, Dutch swimmer
1945 – Bob Segarini, American-Canadian singer-songwriter 
1947 – Emlyn Hughes, English footballer (d. 2004)
  1947   – Liza Wang, Hong Kong actress and singer
1948 – Vonda N. McIntyre, American author (d. 2019)
  1948   – Murray Parker, New Zealand cricketer and educator
  1948   – Heather Reisman, Canadian publisher and businesswoman
  1948   – Danny Seraphine, American drummer and producer 
  1948   – Elizabeth Wilmshurst, English academic and jurist
1949 – Hugh Cornwell, English singer-songwriter and guitarist
  1949   – Svetislav Pešić, Serbian basketball player and coach
1950 – Ron Guidry, American baseball player and coach
  1950   – Tony Husband, English cartoonist
1951 – Colin McAdam, Scottish footballer (d. 2013)
  1951   – Wayne Osmond, American singer-songwriter and actor 
  1951   – Keiichi Suzuki, Japanese singer-songwriter 
1952 – Jacques Chagnon, Canadian educator and politician
  1952   – Rita Dove, American poet and essayist
  1952   – Wendelin Wiedeking, German businessman
1953 – Ditmar Jakobs, German footballer
  1953   – Tõnu Kaljuste, Estonian conductor and journalist
1954 – Katharine Abraham, American feminist economist
  1954   – George M. Church, American geneticist, chemist, and engineer
  1954   – John Dorahy, Australian rugby player and coach
  1954   – Ravi Kanbur, Indian-English economist and academic
1956 – Luis Guzmán, Puerto Rican-American actor and producer
  1956   – Steve Whiteman, American singer-songwriter 
1957 – Greg Clark, English businessman and politician, Secretary of State for Communities and Local Government
  1957   – Ivo Josipović, Croatian lawyer, jurist, and politician, 3rd President of Croatia
  1957   – Daniel Stern, American actor and director
  1957   – Ai Weiwei, Chinese sculptor and activist
1958 – Scott Hamilton, American figure skater 
1959 – Brian Thompson, American actor, director, producer, and screenwriter
1961 – Kim Appleby, English singer-songwriter and actress 
  1961   – Cliff Benson, American football player
  1961   – Jennifer Coolidge, American actress
  1961   – Deepak Tijori, Indian actor and director
  1961   – Ian Pont, English cricketer and coach
1962 – Paul Allen, English footballer
  1962   – Craig Anton, American actor and screenwriter
  1962   – David Fincher, American director and producer
1963 – Regina Jacobs, American runner
  1963   – Maria Gheorghiu, Romanian folk singer-songwriter
1964 – Lee Janzen, American golfer
  1964   – Kaj Leo Johannesen, Faroese footballer and politician, 12th Prime Minister of the Faroe Islands
1965 – Dan Crowley, Australian rugby player
  1965   – Sonia Kruger, Australian television host and actress
  1965   – Satoshi Tajiri, Japanese video game developer; created Pokémon
  1965   – Shania Twain, Canadian singer-songwriter
1966 – Priya Dutt, Indian social worker and politician
1967 – Jamie Osborne, English jockey and trainer
1968 – Billy Boyd, Scottish actor and singer
1969 – Jack Black, American actor and comedian
  1969   – Sheryl Sandberg, American business executive
  1969   – Mary McCartney, English photographer and activist
  1969   – Jason Priestley, Canadian actor, director, and producer 
  1969   – Pierre Turgeon, Canadian-American ice hockey player
1970 – Melina Aslanidou, German-Greek singer-songwriter
  1970   – Rick Recht, American singer-songwriter
1971 – Shane Andrews, American baseball player
  1971   – Todd Eldredge, American figure skater and coach
  1971   – Janet Evans, American swimmer
  1971   – Raúl Márquez, Mexican-American boxer and sportscaster
1972 – Ravindu Shah, Kenyan cricketer
  1972   – Jay Witasick, American baseball player and coach
1973 – J. August Richards, American actor
1974 – Johan Andersson, Swedish game designer and programmer
  1974   – Takahito Eguchi, Japanese pianist and composer
  1974   – Carsten Jancker, German footballer and manager
1975 – Jamie Cureton, English footballer
  1975   – Gareth Farrelly, Irish footballer and manager
  1975   – Hamish McLachlan, Australian television personality
  1975   – Royce Willis, New Zealand rugby player
1976 – Federico Magallanes, Uruguayan footballer
1978 – Karine Turcotte, Canadian weightlifter
1979 – Shaila Dúrcal, Spanish singer-songwriter
  1979   – Robert Hoyzer, German footballer and referee
  1979   – Kristen Hughes, Australian netball player
  1979   – Markus Pröll, German footballer
  1979   – Ruth Riley, American basketball player
1980 – Antony Hämäläinen, Finnish singer-songwriter 
  1980   – Debra Lafave, sex offender and former American teacher
  1980   – Jaakko Ojaniemi, Finnish decathlete
  1980   – Carly Pope, Canadian actress and producer
  1980   – Jonathan Reynolds, English lawyer and politician
1981 – Matt Alrich, American lacrosse player
  1981   – Kezia Dugdale, Scottish politician
  1981   – Martin Erat, Czech ice hockey player
  1981   – Daniel Gygax, Swiss footballer
  1981   – Raphael Matos, Brazilian race car driver
  1981   – Jake Owen, American singer-songwriter and guitarist
  1981   – Ahmed Talbi, Moroccan footballer
  1981   – Agata Wróbel, Polish weightlifter
1982 – Anderson Silva de França, Brazilian footballer
  1982   – Kevin McNaughton, Scottish footballer
  1982   – Thiago Motta, Brazilian-Italian footballer
  1982   – LeAnn Rimes, American singer-songwriter and actress
1983 – Lasith Malinga, Sri Lankan cricketer
  1983   – Luke McAlister, New Zealand rugby player
  1983   – Lilli Schwarzkopf, German heptathlete
1985 – Kjetil Jansrud, Norwegian skier
1986 – Jeff Green, American basketball player
  1986   – Armie Hammer, American actor
  1986   – Tommy Hanson, American baseball player (d. 2015)
  1986   – Simon Mannering, New Zealand rugby league player
  1986   – Gilad Shalit, Israeli soldier and hostage 
  1986   – Florence Welch, English singer-songwriter 
1987 – Caleb Moore, American snowmobile racer (d. 2013)
1988 – Rosie MacLennan, Canadian trampoline gymnast
1989 – César Azpilicueta, Spanish footballer
  1989   – Valtteri Bottas, Finnish race car driver
  1989   – Jo Kwon, South Korean singer and dancer
1990 – Bojan Krkić, Spanish footballer
1991 – Felicio Brown Forbes, German footballer
  1991   – Andreja Pejić, Bosnian model 
1992 – Gabriela Drăgoi, Romanian gymnast
  1992   – Bismack Biyombo, Congolese basketball player
  1992   – Max Collins, American-Filipino actress and model
1993 – Jakub Sokolík, Czech footballer
1994 – Manon Arcangioli, French tennis player
1994     – Ons Jabeur, Tunisian tennis player
1998 – Weston McKennie, American soccer player 
2001 – Kamilla Rakhimova, Russian tennis player
2003 – Quvenzhané Wallis, American actress

Deaths

Pre-1600
 388 – Magnus Maximus, Roman emperor (b. 335)
 430 – Augustine of Hippo, Algerian bishop, theologian, and saint (b. 354)
 476 – Orestes, Roman general and politician
 632 – Fatimah, daughter of Muhammad (b. 605)
 683 – Kʼinich Janaab Pakal I, ajaw of the city-state of Palenque (b. 615) 
 770 – Kōken, emperor of Japan (b. 718)
 876 – Louis the German, Frankish king (b. 804)
 919 – He Gui, Chinese general (b. 858)
1055 – Xing Zong, Chinese emperor (b. 1016)
1149 – Mu'in ad-Din Unur, Turkish ruler and regent
1231 – Eleanor of Portugal, Queen of Denmark
1341 – Levon IV, king of Armenia (b. 1309)
1406 – John de Sutton V, Baron Sutton of Dudley (b. 1380)
1481 – Afonso V, king of Portugal (b. 1432)
1540 – Federico II Gonzaga, duke of Mantua (b. 1500)

1601–1900
1609 – Francis Vere, English governor and general
1645 – Hugo Grotius, Dutch playwright, philosopher, and jurist (b. 1583)
1646 – Johannes Banfi Hunyades, English-Hungarian alchemist, chemist and metallurgist. (b. 1576)
1648 – George Lisle, English general (b. 1610)
  1648   – Charles Lucas, English general (b. 1613)
1654 – Axel Oxenstierna, Swedish lawyer and politician, Lord High Chancellor of Sweden (b. 1583)
1665 – Elisabetta Sirani, Italian painter (b. 1638)
1678 – John Berkeley, 1st Baron Berkeley of Stratton, English soldier and politician, Lord Lieutenant of Ireland (b. 1602)
1735 – Edwin Stead, English landowner and cricketer (b. 1701)
1757 – David Hartley, English psychologist and philosopher (b. 1705)
1784 – Junípero Serra, Spanish priest and missionary (b. 1713)
1793 – Adam Philippe, Comte de Custine, French general (b. 1740)
1805 – Alexander Carlyle, Scottish church leader and author (b. 1722)
1818 – Jean Baptiste Point du Sable, American fur trader, founded Chicago (b. 1750)
1820 – Andrew Ellicott, American surveyor and urban planner (b. 1754)
1839 – William Smith, English geologist and engineer (b. 1769)
1888 – Julius Krohn, Finnish poet and journalist (b. 1835)
1891 – Robert Caldwell, English missionary and linguist (b. 1814)
1900 – Henry Sidgwick, English economist and philosopher (b. 1838)

1901–present
1903 – Frederick Law Olmsted, American journalist and architect, co-designed Central Park (b. 1822)
1919 – Adolf Schmal, Austrian fencer and cyclist (b. 1872)
1934 – Edgeworth David, Welsh-Australian geologist and explorer (b. 1858)
1937 – George Prendergast, Australian politician, 28th Premier of Victoria (b. 1854)
1943 – Georg Hellat, Estonian architect (b. 1870)
  1943   – Boris III of Bulgaria (b. 1894)
1955 – Emmett Till, American murder victim (b. 1941)
1959 – Bohuslav Martinů, Czech-American composer and educator (b. 1890)
1965 – Giulio Racah, Italian-Israeli physicist and mathematician (b. 1909)
1968 – Dimitris Pikionis, Greek architect and academic (b. 1887)
1971 – Reuvein Margolies, Israeli author and scholar (b. 1889)
1972 – Prince William of Gloucester (b. 1941)
1975 – Fritz Wotruba, Austrian sculptor (b. 1907)
1976 – Anissa Jones, American actress (b. 1958)
1978 – Bruce Catton, American historian and journalist (b. 1899)
  1978   – Robert Shaw, English actor (b. 1927)
1981 – Béla Guttmann, Hungarian footballer, coach, and manager (b. 1899)
1982 – Geoff Chubb, South African cricketer (b. 1911)
1984 – Muhammad Naguib, Egyptian general and politician, 1st President of Egypt (b. 1901)
1985 – Ruth Gordon, American actress and screenwriter (b. 1896)
1986 – Russell Lee, American photographer and journalist (b. 1903)
1987 – John Huston, Irish actor, director, and screenwriter (b. 1906)
1988 – Jean Marchand, Canadian union leader and politician, 43rd Secretary of State for Canada (b. 1918)
  1988   – Max Shulman, American author and screenwriter (b. 1919)
1989 – John Steptoe, American author and illustrator (b. 1950)
1990 – Willy Vandersteen, Belgian author and illustrator (b. 1913)
1991 – Alekos Sakellarios, Greek director and screenwriter (b. 1913)
1993 – William Stafford, American poet and academic (b. 1914)
1995 – Earl W. Bascom, American rodeo performer and painter (b. 1906)
  1995   – Michael Ende, German scientist and author (b. 1929)
2005 – Jacques Dufilho, French actor (b. 1914)
  2005   – Esther Szekeres, Hungarian-Australian mathematician and academic (b. 1910)
  2005   – George Szekeres, Hungarian-Australian mathematician and academic (b. 1911)
2006 – Heino Lipp, Estonian shot putter and discus thrower (b. 1922)
  2006   – Benoît Sauvageau, Canadian educator and politician (b. 1963)
  2006   – Melvin Schwartz, American physicist and academic, Nobel Prize laureate (b. 1932)
2007 – Arthur Jones, American businessman, founded Nautilus, Inc. and MedX Corporation (b. 1926)
  2007   – Hilly Kristal, American businessman, founded CBGB (b. 1932)
  2007   – Paul MacCready, American engineer and businessman, founded AeroVironment (b. 1925)
  2007   – Francisco Umbral, Spanish journalist and author (b. 1935)
  2007   – Miyoshi Umeki, Japanese-American actress (b. 1929)
2008 – Phil Hill, American race car driver (b. 1927)
2009 – Adam Goldstein, American drummer, DJ, and producer (b. 1973)
  2009   – Richard Egan, US Ambassador, Owner of Dell EMC, Engineer (b. 1963)
2010 – William P. Foster, American bandleader and educator (b. 1919)
2011 – Bernie Gallacher, English footballer (b. 1967)
2012 – Rhodes Boyson, English educator and politician (b. 1925)
  2012   – Shulamith Firestone, Canadian-American activist and author (b. 1945)
  2012   – Dick McBride, American author, poet, and playwright (b. 1928)
  2012   – Saul Merin, Polish-Israeli ophthalmologist and academic (b. 1933)
  2012   – Ramón Sota, Spanish golfer (b. 1938)
2013 – John Bellany, Scottish painter and academic (b. 1942)
  2013   – Lorella Cedroni, Italian political scientist and philosopher (b. 1961)
  2013   – Edmund B. Fitzgerald, American businessman (b. 1926)
  2013   – Frank Pulli, American baseball player and umpire (b. 1935)
  2013   – Barry Stobart, English footballer (b. 1938)
  2013   – Rafael Díaz Ycaza, Ecuadorian journalist, author, and poet (b. 1925)
2014 – Glenn Cornick, English bass guitarist (b. 1947)
  2014   – Hal Finney, American cryptographer and programmer (b. 1956)
  2014   – John Anthony Walker, American soldier and spy (b. 1937)
2015 – Al Arbour, Canadian-American ice hockey player and coach (b. 1932)
  2015   – Mark Krasniqi, Kosovan ethnographer, poet, and translator (b. 1920)
  2015   – Nelson Shanks, American painter and educator (b. 1937)
2016 – Juan Gabriel, Mexican singer and songwriter (b. 1950)
  2016   – Mr. Fuji, American professional wrestler and manager (b. 1934)
2017 – Mireille Darc, French actress and model (b. 1938)
2020 – Chadwick Boseman, American actor and playwright (b. 1976)

Holidays and observances
Christian feast day:
Alexander of Constantinople
Augustine of Hippo
Edmund Arrowsmith
Hermes
Moses the Black 
August 28 (Eastern Orthodox liturgics)
National Grandparents Day (Mexico)

References

External links

 
 
 

Days of the year
August